Dance of Passions (German:Tanz der Leidenschaft) is a 1922 German silent film directed by Charles Willy Kayser.

Cast
 Rita Clermont as Evelyn  
 Charles Willy Kayser as Edward  
 Fritz Falkenberg as Inder  
 Willy Kaiser-Heyl as Handelsherr  
 Carlo Berger 
 Trude Singer

References

Bibliography
 Grange, William. Cultural Chronicle of the Weimar Republic. Scarecrow Press, 2008.

External links

1922 films
Films of the Weimar Republic
German silent feature films
German black-and-white films